Carlingford may refer to:

Canada
 Carlingford, New Brunswick, Canada, a rural community near the US border 
 Carlingford, Ontario, a community in southwestern Ontario, Canada

Ireland
Carlingford, County Louth, a medieval village in Ireland
 Carlingford Mountain, which rises nearby, the highest peak of which is known as Slieve Foy
 Carlingford Lough, the sea loch where the village is located

Elsewhere
 Carlingford, New South Wales, a suburb in north-west Sydney, Australia
 Carlingford, a fictional small town in England, in the short stories of Margaret Oliphant (1828-1897)